The London WCT was a men's professional tennis tournament held on indoor carpet courts at the Earls Court Exhibition Centre in London, England. It was the sixth and final edition of the tournament and was held from 28 March through 3 April 1977. The event was part of the 1977 World Championship Tennis circuit. Fourth-seeded Eddie Dibbs won the singles title and £18,000 / $30,000 first–prize money.

Finals

Singles
 Eddie Dibbs defeated  Vitas Gerulaitis 7–6(7–2), 6–7(5–7), 6–4
 It was Dibbs' 2nd singles title of the year and the 12th of his career.

Doubles
 Ilie Năstase /  Adriano Panatta defeated  Mark Cox /  Eddie Dibbs 7–6(7–5), 6–7(3–7), 6–3

References

External links
 ITF tournament edition details

Rothmans International Tennis Tournament
Rothmans International Tennis Tournament
Rothmans International Tennis Tournament
Rothmans International Tennis Tournament
Rothmans International Tennis Tournament
Rothmans International Tennis Tournament